Mozhaysky Uyezd (Можайский уезд) was one of the subdivisions of the Moscow Governorate of the Russian Empire. It was situated in the western part of the governorate. Its administrative centre was Mozhaysk.

Demographics
At the time of the Russian Empire Census of 1897, Mozhaysky Uyezd had a population of 53,967. Of these, 99.6% spoke Russian, 0.1% Polish, 0.1% Belarusian and 0.1% German as their native language.

References

 
Uezds of Moscow Governorate
Moscow Governorate